Alfred Magill Randolph (August 31, 1836 – April 6, 1918) was the first bishop of Southern Virginia in The Episcopal Church.

Early and family life
Alfred Magill Randolph was born on August 31, 1836, at "the Meadows" in Winchester, Virginia to Mary Buckner Thruston Magill Randolph (1809-1890, whose family's house that was) and her husband Robert Lee Randolph (1791-1857) of Casanova, Fauquier County, Virginia. His father's family could trace its ancestry to colonial days and was one of the First Families of Virginia. His ancestor Col. William Randolph of Yorkshire, England emigrated in 1674 and was clerk of Henrico County, Virginia as well as member of the House of Burgesses and rose to Speaker and member of the Royal Council, as well as helped found the College of William and Mary. Alfred Randolph was one of four brothers—his younger brother Buckner Magill Randolph (1842-1903) also becoming an Episcopal priest in the Diocese of Virginia. Other siblings were: William Fitzhugh Randolph (1831-1914), Mary Magill Turner (1833-1910) and Beverly Randolph (1839-1917); his sister Elizabeth died in infancy (1837). The R. L. Randolph family owned 61 slaves in the 1840 census, and at least 70 in the 1850 census, the last before the patriarch's death.

After education by private tutors, Alfred Randolph attended the College of William & Mary in Williamsburg, from which he graduated in 1855. He then moved to Alexandria to study for the ministry, and graduated from the Virginia Theological Seminary in 1858. He later received honorary doctorates from William and Mary College in 1876, Washington and Lee University in 1887, and the University of the South in 1902.

On April 27, 1859, he married Sarah (Sallie) Griffith Hoxton (1840-1923) of Alexandria, whose late father William W. Hoxton had served as a U.S. Army doctor. Their children included Dr. Robert Lee Randolph (1860-1919), Elizabeth L. Randolph Ambler (1862-1910), Mary T. Randolph (1865-1873), Alfred M. Randolph Jr (1868-1927), Sallie W. Randolph (1870-1891), Evelyn B. Randolph Wright (1872-1923), Eleanor C. Randolph Garnett (1875-1958) and Frances H. Randolph Taylor (1878-1957).

Career
After graduation, the newly ordained deacon was assigned to St. George's Church in Fredericksburg, Virginia, whose long-serving rector, Dr. McGuire, suffered a fatal heart attack just two weeks later. The young minister took charge of the parish so well that five months later he was made rector at age 22, shortly after being ordained an Episcopal priest in 1860. During the American Civil War, Fredericksburg was subject to repeated shelling and severe fighting, so Rev. Randolph evacuated with his family in 1862.

Rev. Randolph became a chaplain in the Confederate Army and served from 1862 to 1865. After the war ended, Rev. Randolph briefly led a parish in Halifax, Virginia.

After Bishop John Johns consolidated the Unionist and Confederate parishes, Rev. Randolph returned to Alexandria and served as rector at historic Christ Church from 1867 to 1867. He then accepted the rectorship at Emmanuel Church in Baltimore, Maryland, where he served from 1867 to 1883.

In 1883, Randolph was named assistant bishop of Virginia, to serve under Rt.Rev. Francis McNeece Whittle. Presiding Bishop Alfred Lee of Delaware  led the service of consecration at Baltimore's Emmanuel Church, joined by John Williams of Connecticut, William B. W. Howe of South Carolina, Thomas Underwood Dudley of Kentucky, Burgess, William Stevens Perry of Iowa, and George William Peterkin of West Virginia, among others. He moved to Richmond, but visited throughout the large diocese.

When the Diocese of Southern Virginia was created in 1892, he became its first bishop and established his seat at Norfolk. Rt. Rev. Randolph believed strongly in education, including for African Americans and women, and became President of the Bishop Payne Divinity School in Petersburg, as well as President of the Boards of Trustees of St. Paul's Normal and Industrial School in Lawrenceville and of the Sweet Briar Institute in Amherst.

Death and legacy
Bishop Randolph died in Norfolk 1918, succeeded by his co-adjutor since 1906 Beverley D. Tucker. Rt. Rev. Tucker also presided over the funeral service at St. Paul's Church in Norfolk, which included a Confederate honor guard. Bishop Randolph was interred at Hollywood Cemetery in Richmond. Former Maryland Confederate soldier and President of the House of Deputies Rev. Randolph H. McKim, who had succeeded Rev. Randolph at Alexandria's Christ Church delivered a eulogy at his other former parish, Emmanuel Church in Baltimore.

References

Virginia Theological Seminary alumni
College of William & Mary alumni
Confederate States Army chaplains
People of Virginia in the American Civil War
19th-century American Episcopalians
20th-century American Episcopalians
1836 births
1918 deaths
Episcopal bishops of Southern Virginia